Muskeg Lake 102F is an Indian reserve of the Muskeg Lake Cree Nation in Saskatchewan. It is 41 kilometres southwest of Shellbrook. In the 2016 Canadian Census, it recorded a population of 20 living in 8 of its 8 total private dwellings.

References

Indian reserves in Saskatchewan
Division No. 16, Saskatchewan